This is a list of human anatomical parts named after people.  These are often called eponyms.

Alphabetical list
For clarity, entries are listed by the name of the person associated with them, so Loop of Henle is listed under H not L.

A
 Achilles tendonAchilles, Greek mythological character
 Adam's appleAdam, Biblical figure
 Adonis's belt, Apollo's beltAdonis, Apollo, Greek mythological characters
 Alcock's canal (pudendal canal)Benjamin Alcock (18011859?), Irish anatomist
 Artery of AdamkiewiczAlbert Wojciech Adamkiewicz (18501921), Polish pathologist
 Auerbach's plexusLeopold Auerbach

B
 Bachmann's bundleJean George Bachmann (18771959), German-American physiologist
 Balbiani bodiesÉdouard-Gérard Balbiani
 Bartholin's glandCaspar Bartholin the Younger (16551738), Danish anatomist
 Batson's plexusOscar Vivian Batson (18941979), American anatomist
 Long thoracic nerve of BellSir Charles Bell (17741842), Scottish surgeon-anatomist
 Duct of BelliniLorenzo Bellini (16431704), Italian anatomist
 Renal columns of BertinExupere Joseph Bertin (17121781), French anatomist
 Betz cellsVladimir Alekseyevich Betz (18341894), Ukrainian histologist
 Billroth's cordsTheodor Billroth (18291894), Austrian surgeon
 Bowman's capsule and Bowman's layerSir William Bowman (18161892), English surgeon-anatomist
 Broca's areaPaul Broca (18241880), French surgeon-anatomist
 Brodmann's areasKorbinian Brodmann (18681918), German neurologist
 Brunner's glandsJohann Conrad Brunner (16531727), Swiss anatomist
 Buck's fasciaGurdon Buck (18071877), American surgeon

C
 Cajal cellSantiago Ramón y Cajal (18521934), Spanish pathologist
 Cajal–Retzius cellSantiago Ramón y Cajal and Gustaf Retzius (18421919), Swedish histologist
 Calyx of Held Hans Held (1866–1942), German Anatomist
 Calot's triangleJean-François Calot (18611944), French surgeon
 Fascia of Camper - Petrus Camper (1722-1789), Dutch physician, anatomist, physiologist, midwife, zoologist, anthropologist, palaeontologist and a naturalist
Chassaignac tubercleCharles Marie Édouard Chassaignac (18041879), French physician
 Clara cellMax Clara (18991966), German anatomist (renamed to Club cell after Max Clara's Nazi activities were discovered)
 Cloquet's canal Jules Cloquet (1790–1883), French Anatomist
 Colles' fasciaAbraham Colles (17731843), Irish surgeon
 Cooper's fasciaAstley Cooper (17681841), English surgeon
 Inguinal ligament of Cooper or Cooper's iliopectineal ligamentAstley Cooper
 Cooper's suspensory ligamentsAstley Cooper
 Organ of CortiAlfonso Corti (18221876), Italian microanatomist
 Cowper's glandsWilliam Cowper (16661709), English surgeon-anatomist
 Cuvier ductsGeorges Cuvier (17691832), French Naturalist and comparative anatomist
Canals of Lambert - described by Lambert in 1955

D
 Darwin's tubercleCharles Darwin (18091882), British Naturalist
 Denonvilliers' fasciaCharles-Pierre Denonvilliers (18081872), French surgeon
 Descemet's membrane Jean Descemet (17321810), French physician
 Space of DisseJoseph Disse (18521912), German histologist
 Dorello's canalPrimo Dorello (18721963), Italian Anatomist.
 Pouch of Douglas, Douglas' lineJames Douglas (16751742), Scottish anatomist

E
 Von Ebner's glandsVictor von Ebner (18421925), German histologist
 Edinger–Westphal nucleusLudwig Edinger (18551918), German neuroanatomist, and Karl Friedrich Otto Westphal (18331890), German neurologist
 Eustachian tubeBartolomeo Eustachi (1500 / 1514 / 15201574), Italian anatomist

F
 Fallopian tubeGabriele Falloppio (15231562), Italian anatomist

G
 Gallaudet's fasciaBern Budd Gallaudet (18601934), American anatomist
 Gartner's ductHermann Treschow Gartner (17851827), Danish surgeon-anatomist
 Gerdy's FibersPierre Nicolas Gerdy (17971856), French physician
 Gerota CapsuleDumitru Gerota (18671939), Romanian urology surgeon-anatomist
 Giacomini veinCarlo Giacomini (18401898) Italian anatomist
 Glisson's capsuleFrancis Glisson (1599?1677), English anatomist
 Golgi apparatus and Golgi receptorCamillo Golgi (18431926), Italian pathologist
 Graafian follicleRegnier de Graaf (16411673), Dutch anatomist
 Gräfenberg spot (G-spot)Ernst Gräfenberg (18811957), German-American gynecologist
 Great vein of Galen and the other veins of GalenGalen (129 AD200 / 216 AD), an ancient Greek physician

H
 Hartmann's pouchHenri Hubert Vadim Hartmann (1860–1952), German Surgeon
 Hasner's FoldJoseph Hasner (18191892), Austrian ophthalmologist
 Haversian canalClopton Havers (16571702), English physician
 Spiral valves of HeisterLorenz Heister (16831758), German surgeon-anatomist
 Loop of HenleF. G. J. Henle (18091885), German pathologist
 Canals of HeringKarl Ewald Konstantin Hering (18341918), German physiologist
 Hering's nerveHeinrich Ewald Hering (18661948), Austrian physician
 Herring bodiesPercy Theodore Herring (18721967), English physiologist
 Heschl's gyriRichard L. Heschl (18241881), Austrian anatomist
 Hesselbach's triangleFranz Kaspar Hesselbach (17591816), German surgeon-anatomist
 Antrum of HighmoreNathaniel Highmore (16131685), English surgeon-anatomist
 Bundle of HisWilhelm His, Jr. (18631934), Swiss cardiologist
 Houston's muscle (Bulbocavernous Penile Fibers)John Houston (18021845), Irish anatomist
  Houston's valves John Houston (1802-1845), Irish anatomist
 Canal of HuguierPierre Charles Huguier (18041878), French surgeon-gynecologist
 Hurthle cellKarl Hürthle (18601945), German histologist

I
 Iris (anatomy)Iris, Greek mythological character

K
 Kerckring's valvesTheodor Kerckring (16381693), Dutch anatomist
 Kernohan notchJames Watson Kernohan (18961981), Irish-American pathologist
 Kiesselbach's plexusWilhelm Kiesselbach (1839-1902), German otolaryngologist
 Pores of KohnHans Kohn
 Krause's end-bulbsWilhelm Krause
 Kupffer cellsKarl Wilhelm von Kupffer

L
 Langer's linesKarl Langer
 Islets of Langerhans and Langerhans cellPaul Langerhans
 Langhans giant cellTheodor Langhans
 Lauth's canalThomas Lauth
 Leydig CellsFranz Leydig
 Crypts of LieberkühnJohann Nathanael Lieberkühn
 Lissauer's tractHeinrich Lissauer
 Lister's tubercleJoseph Lister
 Little's plexus
 Urethral glands of LittréAlexis Littré
 Lockwood's ligamentCharles Barrett Lockwood
 Angle of LouisAntoine Louis
 Lovibond's angle
 Lund's node
 Crypts of Luschka, Ducts of Luschka, Foramina of Luschka, and Luschka's jointsHubert von Luschka

M
 Macewen's triangleSir William Macewen
 Foramen of MagendieFrançois Magendie
 McBurney's pointCharles McBurney
 Malpighian corpuscleMarcello Malpighi, the name given to both renal corpuscle and splenic lymphoid nodules
 Meckel's cartilage and Meckel's diverticulumJohann Friedrich Meckel
 Meibomian glandsHeinrich Meibom
 Meissner's corpuscle and Meissner's plexusGeorg Meissner
 Merkel cellFriedrich Sigmund Merkel
 Meyer's loop
 Moll's glandJacob Anton Moll
 Space of Möll
 Foramina of MonroAlexander Monro
 Glands of MontgomeryWilliam Fetherstone Montgomery
 Hydatids of Morgagni, and Lacunae of MorgagniGiovanni Battista Morgagni
 Morison's pouchJames Rutherford Morison
 Müllerian ductsJohannes Peter Müller

N
 Nissl bodies or granules and Nissl substanceFranz Nissl

O
 Sphincter of OddiRuggero Oddi

P
 Pacinian corpusclesFilippo Pacini
 Paneth cellsJoseph Paneth
 Papez circuitJames Papez
 Artery of PercheronGerard Percheron
 Peyer's patchesJohann Conrad Peyer
 Poupart's ligamentFrançois Poupart
 Prussak's spaceAlexander Prussak
 Purkinje cellsJan E. Purkinje
 Purkinje fibresJan E. Purkinje
 Pimenta's Point

R
 Island of Reil  Johann Christian Reil (1759-1813)
 Node of RanvierLouis-Antoine Ranvier
 Rathke's pouchMartin Heinrich Rathke
 Reichert cartilageKarl Bogislaus Reichert
 Renshaw cellsBirdsey Renshaw  (19081948)
 Space of Retzius and Veins of RetziusAnders Retzius
 Riedel's lobeBernhard Moritz Carl Ludwig Riedel
 Rokitansky–Aschoff sinusesCarl Freiherr von Rokitansky and Ludwig Aschoff
 Rolandic fissure and fissure of RolandoLuigi Rolando
 Rotter's lymph nodesJosef Rotter
 Ruffini's corpusclesAngelo Ruffini

S
 Duct of SantoriniGiovanni Domenico Santorini
 Fascia of ScarpaAntonio Scarpa (1752–1832), Italian professor and anatomist
 Canal of SchlemmFriedrich Schlemm
 Schwann CellTheodor Schwann
 Sertoli cellEnrico Sertoli
 Sharpey's fibresWilliam Sharpey
 Shrapnell's membraneHenry Jones Shrapnell
 Skene's glandAlexander Skene
 Spiegelian fascia, Spiegelian line, Spiegelian lobe Adriaan van den Spiegel
 Stensen's ductNiels Stensen
 Stilling's canal
 Struthers' ligamentSir John Struthers
 Sylvian aqueductFranciscus Sylvius

T
 Thebesian foraminaAdam Christian Thebesius
 Thebesian valveAdam Christian Thebesius
 Thebesian veinAdam Christian Thebesius
 White lines of ToldtCarl Toldt
 Torcular herophiliHerophilus
 Traube's spaceLudwig Traube-
Ligament, veil or bloodless fold of Treves -- Sir Frederick Treves
 Ligament of TreitzVáclav Treitz

V
 Sinus of ValsalvaAntonio Maria Valsalva
 Ampulla of VaterAbraham Vater
 Limbus of VieussensRaymond Vieussens
 Valve of VieussensRaymond Vieussens
 Vieussens valve of the Coronary SinusRaymond Vieussens
 Virchow–Robin spacesRudolf Virchow and Charles-Philippe Robin
 Virchow's nodeRudolf Virchow

W
 Waldeyer's tonsillar ringHeinrich Wilhelm Gottfried von Waldeyer-Hartz (1836–1921), German anatomist
 Weibel–Palade bodyEwald R. Weibel (1929–2019), Swiss biologist, and George Emil Palade (1912–2008), Romanian-American cell biologist 
 Wenckebach's bundleKarel Frederik Wenckebach (1864–1940), Dutch anatomist
 Wernicke's areaKarl Wernicke (1848–1905), German physician, anatomist, psychiatrist and neuropathologist
 Wharton's duct and Wharton's jellyThomas Wharton (1614–1673), English physician and anatomist
 Circle of Willisarterial circle in base of brainDr. Thomas Willis (16211675), English physician
 Foramen of WinslowJean-Jacques Bénigne Winslow (1669–1760), Danish-born French anatomist
 Duct of WirsungJohann Georg Wirsung (1589–1643), German anatomist
 Wolffian ductKaspar Friedrich Wolff (1733–1794), German physiologist
 Wormian bonesOle Worm (1588–1654), Danish scientist

Z
 Zonule of ZinnJohann Gottfried Zinn (1727–1759), German anatomist and botanist
 Organ of ZuckerkandlEmil Zuckerkandl (1849–1910), Hungarian anatomist

See also
 Human anatomy
 List of anatomical topics
 List of eponymous diseases
 List of eponymous medical signs
 List of eponymous medical treatments
 Lists of etymologies
 List of eponyms in neuroscience

External links 
 Whonamedit, name origins in the medical field

Anatomical parts
Named after people